Esperanza is a metro station on Line 4 of the Madrid Metro. It is located in fare Zone A.

Manu Chao's 2001 album Próxima Estación: Esperanza is named after the metro station.

References 

Line 4 (Madrid Metro) stations
Railway stations in Spain opened in 1979
Buildings and structures in Hortaleza District, Madrid